The 1993 Open Gaz de France was a women's tennis tournament played on indoor carpet courts at the Zénith Hall in Paris, France, that was part of Tier II of the 1993 WTA Tour. It was the inaugural edition of the tournament and was held from 15 February until 21 February 1993. Second-seeded Martina Navratilova won the singles title and earned $75,000 first-prize money.

Finasl

Singles
 Martina Navratilova defeated  Monica Seles 6–3, 4–6, 7–6(7–3)
 It was Navratilova's 2nd singles title of the year and the 163rd of her career.

Doubles
 Jana Novotná /  Andrea Strnadová defeated  Jo Durie /  Catherine Suire 7–6, 6–2

References

External links
 ITF tournament edition profile
 Tournament draws

Open Gaz de France
Open GDF Suez
Open Gaz de France
Open Gaz de France
Open Gaz de France